The Fall of the Damned is a painting by Peter Paul Rubens.

Fall of the Damned may also refer to:

 Fall of the Damned into Hell, a painting by Hieronymus Bosch
 The Fall of the Damned (Bouts), a painting by Dirk Bouts

See also 
 The Fall of the Rebel Angels (disambiguation)